Übeyd Adıyaman (born 2 October 1997) is a Turkish football player who plays as a goalkeeper for Gençlerbirliği in the Süper Lig.

Professional career
Adıyaman is a youth product of Gençlerbirliği, and spent most of this early career as their backup goalkeeper. He had several stints on loan with Hacettepe, as well as brief loans with Fethiyespor and BB Bodrumspor. Adıyaman made his professional debut with Gençlerbirliği in a 6-0 Süper Lig loss to Galatasaray on 9 January 2021.

References

External links
 
 

1997 births
Living people
Sportspeople from Malatya
Turkish footballers
Turkey youth international footballers
Gençlerbirliği S.K. footballers
Hacettepe S.K. footballers
Fethiyespor footballers
Süper Lig players
TFF Second League players
Association football goalkeepers